α2-Macroglobulin (α2M), or alpha-2-macroglobulin, is a large (720 KDa) plasma protein found in the blood. It is mainly produced by the liver, and also locally synthesized by macrophages, fibroblasts, and adrenocortical cells. In humans it is encoded by the A2M gene.

α2-Macroglobulin acts as an antiprotease and is able to inactivate an enormous variety of proteinases. It functions as an inhibitor of fibrinolysis by inhibiting plasmin and kallikrein. It functions as an inhibitor of coagulation by inhibiting thrombin. α2-macroglobulin may act as a carrier protein because it also binds to numerous growth factors and cytokines, such as platelet-derived growth factor, basic fibroblast growth factor, TGF-β, insulin, and IL-1β.

No specific deficiency with associated disease has been recognized, and no disease state is attributed to low concentrations of α2-macroglobulin. The concentration of α2-macroglobulin rises 10-fold or more in the nephrotic syndrome when other lower molecular weight proteins are lost in the urine. The loss of α2-macroglobulin into urine is prevented by its large size. The net result is that α2-macroglobulin reaches serum levels equal to or greater than those of albumin in the nephrotic syndrome, which has the effect of maintaining oncotic pressure.

Structure 
Human α2-macroglobulin is composed of four identical subunits bound together by -S-S- bonds. In addition to tetrameric forms of α2-macroglobulin, dimeric, and more recently monomeric αM protease inhibitors have been identified.

Each monomer of human α2-macroglobulin is composed of several functional domains, including macroglobulin domains, a thiol ester-containing domain and a receptor-binding domain. Overall, α2-macroglobulin is the largest major nonimmunoglobulin protein in human plasma.

The amino acid sequence of α2-macroglobulin has been shown to be 71% the same as that of the pregnancy zone protein (PZP; also known as pregnancy-associated α2-glycoprotein).

Function
The α-macroglobulin (αM) family of proteins includes protease inhibitors, typified by the human tetrameric α2-macroglobulin (α2M); they belong to the MEROPS proteinase inhibitor family I39, clan IL. These protease inhibitors share several defining properties, which include (1) the ability to inhibit proteases from all catalytic classes, (2) the presence of a 'bait region' (also known as a sequence of amino acids in an α2-macroglobulin molecule, or a homologous protein, that contains scissile peptide bonds for those proteinases that it inhibits) and a thiol ester, (3) a similar protease inhibitory mechanism and (4) the inactivation of the inhibitory capacity by reaction of the thiol ester with small primary amines. αM protease inhibitors inhibit by steric hindrance. The mechanism involves protease cleavage of the bait region, a segment of the αM that is particularly susceptible to proteolytic cleavage, which initiates a conformational change such that the αM collapses about the protease. In the resulting αM-protease complex, the active site of the protease is sterically shielded, thus substantially decreasing access to protein substrates. Two additional events occur as a consequence of bait region cleavage, namely (1) the h-cysteinyl-g-glutamyl thiol ester becomes highly reactive and (2) a major conformational change exposes a conserved COOH-terminal receptor binding domain  (RBD). RBD exposure allows the αM protease complex to bind to clearance receptors and be removed from circulation. Tetrameric, dimeric, and, more recently, monomeric αM protease inhibitors have been identified.

α2-Macroglobulin is able to inactivate an enormous variety of proteinases (including serine-, cysteine-, aspartic- and metalloproteinases). It functions as an inhibitor of fibrinolysis by inhibiting plasmin and kallikrein. It functions as an inhibitor of coagulation by inhibiting thrombin. α2-Macroglobulin has in its structure a 35 amino acid "bait" region. Proteinases binding and cleaving the bait region become bound to α2M. The proteinase–α2M complex is recognised by macrophage receptors and cleared from the system.

α2-Macroglobulin is known to bind zinc, as well as copper in plasma, even more strongly than albumin, and such it is also known as transcuprein. 10 to 15% of copper in human plasma is chelated by α2-macroglobulin.

Disease
α2-Macroglobulin levels are increased when the serum albumin levels are low, which is most commonly seen in nephrotic syndrome, a condition wherein the kidneys start to leak out some of the smaller blood proteins. Because of its size, α2-macroglobulin is retained in the bloodstream. Increased production of all proteins means α2-macroglobulin concentration increases. This increase has little adverse effect on the health, but is used as a diagnostic clue.

A common variant (29.5%) (polymorphism) of α2-macroglobulin leads to increased risk of Alzheimer's disease.

α2-Macroglobulin binds to and removes the active forms of the gelatinase (MMP-2 and MMP-9) from the circulation via scavenger receptors on the phagocytes.

References

 McPherson & Pincus: Henry's Clinical Diagnosis and Management by Laboratory Methods, 21st ed.
 Firestein: Kelley's Textbook of Rheumatology, 8th edition.

External links
 The MEROPS online database for peptidases and their inhibitors: I39.001
 
    
 

Acute-phase proteins